The 1982 WDF Europe Cup was the 3rd edition of the WDF Europe Cup darts tournament, organised by the World Darts Federation. It was held in Westcliff-on-Sea, Southend, England from October 15 to 16.



Entered Teams
12 countries/associations entered a men's selection in the event.

11 countries/associations entered a womans's selection in the event.

Men's singles

References

Darts tournaments